Marek Štryncl (born 1974 in Jablonec nad Nisou) is a Czech  conductor, violoncellist, choirmaster, and composer. He is the founder and leader of Baroque music ensemble Musica Florea.

Biography 
Marek Štryncl was born in Jablonec nad Nisou, but he comes from the village of Skuhrov, Czech Republic. He studied violoncello at the Teplice conservatory and graduated from the Academy of Performing Arts in Prague (AMU) in 2002 in the field of conducting. He has also studied cello at the Dresdner Akademie für alte Musik, and completed a course of studies in Baroque cello performance in France, Germany and Switzerland.

He was still a student when he established the ensemble Musica Florea in 1992. In 1994 he conducted a recording of Jan Dismas Zelenka's "Missa Sanctissimae Trinitatis" for Studio Matouš and conducted this work at Prague's Spring Music Festival a year later. Also in 1995, he conducted another celebrated work by Zelenka, Sub olea pacis et palma virtutis, at the St. Wenceslas Festival in Prague. Working with Musica Florea he restores to life the works of forgotten composers, especially from the Czech Baroque and Classical periods. He is responsible for programming the ensemble's regular concert series in Prague and in other regions of the Czech Republic, and has initiated the unique theatre project of transportable Baroque stage called Florea Theatrum. He performs on the cello both as a soloist and in chamber works, and also occasionally composes. He has appeared in prestigious festivals such as the Prague Spring International Music Festival, Rezonanzen in Vienna, the Festival van Vlaanderen in Bruges, the Tage alter Musik in Sopron, Strings of Autumn, and Concentus Moraviae. He has made dozens of compact disc recordings, many of which have received top awards: Diapason in 1994, Zlatá Harmonie in 1997, and a Cannes Classical Award in 2003. Nor does he avoid alternative projects – e.g. a recording of symphonic music played on period instruments (works by Antonín Dvořák (2009) and contemporary compositions with the singer Iva Bittová (Vladimír Godár).

As a conductor and choirmaster Štryncl has collaborated with orchestras, ensembles, and soloists such as Magdalena Kožená, Phillipe Jaroussky, Boni Pueri, the Prague Chamber Choir, Les Musiciens du Paradis, and the Prague Philharmonia. His repertoire includes works from the early Baroque to the Romantic period as well as contemporary compositions. Currently Štryncl is teaching orchestral conducting and Baroque cello at Charles University in Prague. In 1994–1995 he was section principal with the North Bohemian Philharmonic Orchestra in Teplice.

References 

1974 births
People from Jablonec nad Nisou
Czech choral conductors
Czech classical cellists
Czech classical musicians
Czech conductors (music)
Male conductors (music)
Living people
21st-century conductors (music)
21st-century Czech male musicians
21st-century cellists